Aleksandra Maltsevskaya (born 5 July 2002) is a Russian-born Polish chess player who holds the FIDE title of International Master (IM).

Biography
Aleksandra Maltsevskaya was a Rostov-on-Don chess school schoolgirl. In 2015, she won the Russian Youth Chess Championship in the U15 Girls age group.

In the 2000s, Maltsevskaya repeatedly represented Russia at the European Youth Chess Championships and World Youth Chess Championships in different age groups, where she won six medals: gold (in 2016, at the European Youth Chess Championship in the U14 girls age group), two silver (in 2015, at the European Youth Chess Championship in the U14 girls age group, and in 2016, at the World Youth Chess Championship in the U14 girls age group) and two bronze (in 2012, at the World Youth Chess Championship in the U10 girls age group, and in 2017, at the World Youth Chess Championship in the U16 girls age group). In 2013, she won silver medal in World School Chess Championship in the U11 girls age group.

In 2018, Maltsevskaya won the World Girls U-20 Championship, held in Gebze, Turkey, and was awarded the FIDE Woman Grandmaster (WGM) title.

References

External links
 
 
 

2002 births
Living people
Russian female chess players
Chess woman grandmasters